Al Jazeera ("The Island") is a state-owned Arabic-language international news network of Qatar. It is based in Doha and operated by the media conglomerate Al Jazeera Media Network. The flagship of the network, its station identification, is Al Jazeera.

The patent holding is a "private foundation for public benefit" under Qatari law. Under this organizational structure, the parent receives funding from the government of Qatar but maintains its editorial independence. In June 2017, the Saudi, Emirati, Bahraini, and Egyptian governments insisted on the closure of the entire conglomerate as one of thirteen demands made to the Government of Qatar during the Qatar diplomatic crisis. The channel has been criticised by some organisations as well as nations such as Saudi Arabia for being "Qatari propaganda".

Etymology
In Arabic,  literally means "the island". Compare the Arabic name  for Upper Mesopotamia, another area of land almost entirely surrounded by water; also Algeciras, Alzira and Algeria.)

History

Launch
Al Jazeera Satellite Channel, now known as AJA, was launched on 1 November 1996 following the closure of the BBC's Arabic language television station, a joint venture with Orbit Communications Company. The BBC channel closed after a year and a half when the Saudi government attempted to censor information, including a graphic report on executions and prominent dissident views.
 
The Emir of Qatar, Sheikh Hamad bin Khalifa, provided a loan of QAR 500 million (US$137 million) to sustain Al Jazeera through its first five years, as Hugh Miles detailed in his book Al Jazeera: The Inside Story of the Arab News Channel That Is Challenging the West. Shares were held by private investors as well as the Qatar government.
 

Al Jazeera's first day on the air was 1 November 1996. It offered 6 hours of programming per day; this increased to 12 hours of programming by the end of 1997. It was broadcast to the immediate neighborhood as a terrestrial signal, and on cable. Al Jazeera is also available through satellites (which was also free to users in the Arab world), although Qatar, and many other Arab countries barred private individuals from having satellite dishes until 2001.
 
At the time of the Al Jazeera Media Network launch, Arabsat was the only satellite broadcasting to the Middle East, and for the first year could only offer Al Jazeera a weak C-band transponder that needed a large satellite dish for reception. A more powerful Ku-band transponder became available as a peace-offering after its user, Canal France International, accidentally beamed 30 minutes of pornography into ultraconservative Saudi Arabia.
 
Al Jazeera was not the first such broadcaster in the Middle East; a number had appeared since the Arabsat satellite, a Saudi Arabia-based venture of 21 Arab governments, took orbit in 1985. The unfolding of Operation Desert Storm on CNN International underscored the power of live television in current events. While other local broadcasters in the region would assiduously avoid material embarrassing to their home governments (Qatar has its own official TV station as well), Al Jazeera was pitched as an impartial news source and platform for discussing issues relating to the Arab world.
 
In presenting "The opinion and the other opinion" (the station's motto), it did not take long for Al Jazeera to shock local viewers by presenting Israelis speaking Hebrew on Arab television for the first time. Lively and far-ranging talk shows, particularly a popular, confrontational one called The Opposite Direction, were a constant source of controversy regarding issues of morality and religion. This prompted a torrent of criticism from the conservative voices among the region's press. It also led to official complaints and censures from neighboring governments. Some jammed Al Jazeera's terrestrial broadcast or expelled its correspondents. In 1999, the Algerian government reportedly cut power to several major cities in order to censor one broadcast. There were also commercial repercussions: a number of Arab countries reportedly pressured advertisers to avoid the channel, to great success.
 
Al Jazeera was the only international news network to have correspondents in Iraq during the Operation Desert Fox bombing campaign in 1998. In a precursor of a pattern to follow, its exclusive video clips were highly prized by Western media.

Around the clock
On 1 January 1999, Al Jazeera began to broadcast for 24 hours daily. Employment had more than tripled in one year to 500 employees. The agency had bureaux at a dozen sites as far away as EU and Russia.
 
However controversial, Al Jazeera was rapidly becoming one of the most influential news agencies in the whole region. Eager for news beyond the official versions of events, Arabs became dedicated viewers. A 2000 estimate pegged nightly viewership at 35 million, ranking Al Jazeera first in the Arab world, over the Saudi Arabia-sponsored Middle East Broadcasting Centre (MBC) and London's Arab News Network (ANN). There were about 70 satellite or terrestrial channels being broadcast to the Middle East, most of them in Arabic. Al Jazeera launched a free Arabic-language web site in January 2001. In addition, the TV feed was soon available in the United Kingdom for the first time via British Sky Broadcasting.

War in Afghanistan
Al Jazeera came to the attention of many in the West during the search for Osama bin Laden and the Taliban in Afghanistan after the 11 September 2001 attacks on the United States. It aired videos it received from Osama bin Laden and the Taliban, deeming new footage of the world's most wanted fugitives to be newsworthy. Some criticized the network for "giving a voice to terrorists". Al Jazeera's Washington, D.C., bureau chief, Hafez al-Mirazi, compared the situation to that of the Unabomber's messages in The New York Times. The network said it had been given the tapes because it had a large Arab audience.
 
Many other TV networks were eager to acquire the same footage. CNN International had exclusive rights to it for six hours before other networks could broadcast, a provision that was broken by the others on at least one controversial occasion. Prime Minister Tony Blair soon appeared on an Al Jazeera talk show on 14 November 2001, to state Britain's case for pursuing the Taliban into Afghanistan.
 
Al Jazeera's prominence rose during the war in Afghanistan because it had opened a bureau in Kabul before the war began. This gave it better access for videotaping events than other networks, which bought Al Jazeera's footage, sometimes for up to $250,000.
 
A United States missile destroyed the Kabul office in 2001. Looking to stay ahead of possible future conflicts, Al Jazeera then opened bureaux in other troubled spots.
 
It also took in fees for sharing its news feed with other networks. It had an estimated 45 million viewers around the world. Al Jazeera soon had to contend with a new rival, Al Arabiya, a venture of the Middle East Broadcasting Center, which was set up in nearby Dubai with Saudi financial backing.
 
On 21 May 2003, Al Jazeera broadcast a three-minute clip from a tape that was obtained from Al Qaeda. The tape about Ayman al-Zawahiri, an Egyptian physician and the intellectual supporter of Al Qaeda. In the tape, Zawahiri mentioned the 11 September attack and more terrorism against the Western countries saying that "The Crusaders and Jews understand only the language of killing and blood. They can only be persuaded through returning coffins, devastated interests, burning towers and collapsed economies."
 
In 2005, Tayseer Allouni, an Al Jazeera journalist who was tasked to interview Osama bin Laden several weeks after the 9/11 attacks was arrested in Spain while he was investigating the Madrid train bombings. Allouni was accused of being close to Al Qaeda, eventually was found guilty, and sentenced to seven years of house arrest.
 
In October 2003, the managing editor of the Saudi newspaper Arab News, John R. Bradley accounted that the Bush administration had told the Qatari government that "If Al Jazeera failed to reconsider its news context, the US would, in turn, have to consider its relation with Qatar."

2003 Iraq War
Before and during the United States-led invasion of Iraq, where Al Jazeera had a presence since 1997, the network's facilities and footage were again highly sought by foreign networks. The channel and its web site also were seeing unprecedented attention from viewers looking for alternatives to embedded reporting and military press conferences.
 
Al Jazeera moved its sports coverage to a new, separate channel on 1 November 2003, allowing for more news and public affairs programming on the original channel. An English language web site had launched earlier in March 2003. The channel had about 1,300 to 1,400 employees, its newsroom editor told The New York Times. There were 23 bureaux around the world and 70 foreign correspondents, with 450 journalists in all.
 
On 1 April 2003, a United States plane fired on Al Jazeera's Baghdad bureau, killing reporter Tareq Ayyoub. The attack was called "a mistake" by The Pentagon; however, Al Jazeera had supplied the US with a precise map of the location of the bureau in order to spare it from attack.

2010s Arab Spring

Al Jazeera became the first channel to air the 2010 Tunisian protests following the death of Mohamed Bouazizi. In a short period, the protests in Tunisia spread to the other Arab states, becoming known as the Arab Spring, often leading to scrutiny from other Arab governments.

2017 Qatar blockade

The closing of the Al Jazeera Media Network was one of the terms of diplomatic reestablishment put forward by Saudi Arabia, United Arab Emirates, Bahrain and Egypt during the 2017 Qatar diplomatic crisis.
 
On 23 June 2017, the countries that cut ties to Qatar issued a list of demands to end the crisis, insisting that Qatar shut down the Al Jazeera network, close a Turkish military base and scale down ties with Iran. The call, included in a list of 13 points, read: "Shut down Al Jazeera and its affiliate stations." Agencies, media outlets, journalists and media rights organisations decried the demands to close Al Jazeera as attempts to curb press freedom, including Reporters Without Borders; The Guardian, The New York Times, and the Committee to Protect Journalists (CPJ).

Earlier, Saudi Arabia and the UAE blocked Al Jazeera websites; Saudi Arabia closed Al Jazeera's bureau in Riyadh and halted its operating licence, accusing the network of promoting "terrorist groups" in the region; and Jordan also revoked the licence for Al Jazeera.
 
On 6 June 2017, Al Jazeera was the victim of a cyber attack on all of its platforms.
 
Qatari Minister of Foreign Affairs, Mohammed bin Abdulrahman bin Jassim Al Thani, has said Doha will not discuss the status of Al Jazeera in any negotiations. "Doha rejects discussing any matter related to Al Jazeera channel as it considers it an internal affair," Qatar News Agency quoted the foreign minister as saying. "Decisions concerning the Qatari internal affairs are Qatari sovereignty - and no one has to interfere with them."
 
In June 2017, hacked emails from Yousef Al Otaiba (UAE ambassador to US) were reported as "embarrassing" by HuffPost because they showed links between the UAE and the US-based pro-Israel Foundation for Defense of Democracies. UAE-based Al Arabiya English claimed that the extensive media coverage of the email hack was a provocation and that the hacking was a move orchestrated by Qatar.
 
On 24 November 2017, Dubai Police deputy chief Lieutenant General Dhahi Khalfan Tamim accused Al Jazeera of provoking the 2017 Sinai attack and called for bombing of Al Jazeera by the Saudi-led coalition, tweeting in Arabic "The alliance must bomb the machine of terrorism ... the channel of ISIL, al-Qaeda and the al-Nusra front, Al Jazeera the terrorists".
 
In 2018, Al Jazeera reported apparent new details regarding a 1996 Qatari coup d'état attempt in a documentary accusing the United Arab Emirates, Saudi Arabia, Bahrain, and Egypt, of orchestrating it. According to the documentary, a former French army commander, Paul Barril, was contracted and supplied with weapons by the UAE to carry out the coup operation in Qatar. UAE minister of foreign affairs Anwar Gargash responded to the documentary and stated that Paul Barril was "in fact a security agent of the Qatari Sheikh Khalifa bin Hamad Al Thani who visited Abu Dhabi and had no relationship with the UAE" and the documentary was "a falsification" attempt to inculpate the UAE in the coup.

United Arab Emirates lobbying
As of June 2019, the United Arab Emirates had paid the lobbying firm Akin Gump Strauss Hauer & Feld $1.9m in the preceding year, principally concerning Qatar government-owned media. Lobbyists met with the FCC nine times and with 30 members of the House and Senate during the same time period. A spokesman for the chair of the Senate Finance Committee, Chuck Grassley, said that the committee had been "reviewing Al Jazeera's activities" prior to the UAE's lobbying effort.
 
During this time, the firm lobbied for Al Jazeera to be reclassified as a foreign agent as defined by the Foreign Agents Registration Act, which was simultaneously the focus of a Twitter campaign. On 20 September 2019, Twitter announced it had shut down two groups of accounts with links to UAE spreading disinformation primarily aimed against Qatar. According to Bloomberg, the archive of the incriminated accounts' tweets showed hundreds of messages attacking Al-Jazeera.

Organization
The original Al Jazeera channel was launched 1 November 1996 by an emiri decree with a loan of 500 million Qatari riyals (US$137 million) from the Emir of Qatar, Sheikh Hamad bin Khalifa. By securing its funding through loans or grants rather than direct government subsidies, the channel seeks to maintain independent editorial policy. The channel began broadcasting in late 1996, with many staff joining from the BBC World Service's Saudi-co-owned Arabic-language TV station, which had shut down on 1 April 1996 after two years of operation because of censorship demands by the Saudi Arabian government.
The Al Jazeera logo is a decorative representation of the network's name using Arabic calligraphy. It was selected by the station's founder, Emir of Qatar Sheikh Hamad bin Khalifa, as the winning entry in a design competition.

Staff

 
Al Jazeera restructured its operations to form a network that contains all their different channels. Wadah Khanfar, the then managing director of the Arabic Channel, was appointed as the director general of Al Jazeera Media Network. He also acted as the managing director of the original Arabic Channel. Khanfar resigned on 20 September 2011 proclaiming that he had achieved his original goals, and that 8 years was enough time for any leader of an organization, in an interview aired on Al Jazeera English. Ahmed bin Jassim Al Thani replaced Khanfar and served as the director general of the channel from September 2011 to June 2013 when he was appointed minister of economy and trade. The chairman of the channel is Hamad bin Thamer Al Thani. The Director General and editor-in-chief of the Arabic website is Mostefa Souag, who replaced Ahmed Sheikh as editor-in-chief. It has more than 100 editorial staff. The managing director of Al Jazeera English is Al Anstey. Mohamed Nanabhay became editor-in-chief of the English-language site in 2009. Previous editors include Beat Witschi and Russell Merryman.
 
Prominent on-air personalities include Faisal al-Qassem, host of the talk show The Opposite Direction, Ahmed Mansour, host of the show Without Borders (bi-la Hudud) and Sami Haddad.
 
Its former Iran and Beirut Bureau Chief was Ghassan bin Jiddo. He became an influential figure on Al Jazeera with his program Hiwar Maftuh, one of the most frequently watched programs. He also interviewed Nasrallah in 2007 and produced a documentary about Hezbollah. Some suggested that he would even replace Wadah Khanfar. Bin Jiddo resigned after political disagreements with the station.

Personnel killed or injured in service 

On 11 May 2022, the Al Jazeera journalist Shireen Abu Akleh was shot during an Israeli raid in Jenin. Videos revealed that she was shot in the head while covering Israeli raid in Jenin. She was in a critical condition and was declared dead at the hospital. Al Jazeera alleged that their journalist was a target of the Israeli security forces, which killed her deliberately. The media house called for the international community to hold Israel accountable for Abu Akleh's death. On the other hand, Israel Defence Forces said their security forces was operating “to arrest suspects in terrorist activities” in the region. They claimed the firing was from both sides, that is, the Israeli forces and the Palestinian gunmen. Abu Akleh's producer was also shot and wounded. Al Jazeera stated that Shireen Abu Akleh was "clearly wearing press jacket that identifies her as a journalist."

Reach
Many governments in the Middle East deploy state-run media or government censorship to impact local media coverage and public opinion, leading to international objections regarding press freedom and biased media coverage. Some scholars and commentators use the notion of contextual objectivity, which highlights the tension between objectivity and audience appeal, to describe the station's controversial yet popular news approach.
 
Increasingly, Al Jazeera Media Network's exclusive interviews and other footage are being rebroadcast in American, British, and other western media outlets such as CNN and the BBC. In January 2003, the BBC announced that it had signed an agreement with Al Jazeera for sharing facilities and information, including news footage.
 
Al Jazeera's availability (via satellite) throughout the Middle East changed the television landscape of the region. Al Jazeera presented controversial views regarding the governments of many Arab states on the Persian Gulf, including Saudi Arabia, Kuwait, Bahrain and Qatar; it also presented controversial views about Syria's relationship with Lebanon, and the Egyptian judiciary. Critics accused Al Jazeera Media Network of sensationalism in order to increase its audience share. Al Jazeera's broadcasts have sometimes resulted in drastic action: for example, when, on 27 January 1999, critics of the Algerian government appeared on the channel's live program El-Itidjah el-Mouakass ("The Opposite Direction"), the Algerian government cut the electricity supply to large parts of the capital Algiers (and allegedly also to large parts of the country) to prevent the program from being seen. Al Jazeera's popularity has been attributed to its in-depth coverage of issues considered to be of great importance to the international Arab population, many of which received minimal attention from other outlets, such as: the Palestinian perspective on the second Intifada, the experiences of Iraqis living through the Iraq war, and the exclusive broadcast of tapes produced by Osama Bin-Laden.
 
At the time of the aforementioned incident in Algeria, Al Jazeera Media Network was not yet generally known in the Western world, but where it was known, opinion was often favorable and Al Jazeera claimed to be the only politically independent television station in the Middle East. However, it was not until late 2001 that Al Jazeera achieved worldwide recognition, when it broadcast video statements by al-Qaeda leaders.
 
Some observers have argued that Al Jazeera Media Network has formidable authority as an opinion-maker. Noah Bonsey and Jeb Koogler, for example, writing in the Columbia Journalism Review, argue that the way in which the station covers any future Israeli-Palestinian peace deal could well determine whether or not that deal is actually accepted by the Palestinian public.
 
The channel's tremendous popularity has also, for better or worse, made it a shaper of public opinion. Its coverage often determines what becomes a story and what does not, as well as how Arab viewers think about issues. Whether in Saudi Arabia, Egypt, Jordan, or Syria, the stories highlighted and the criticisms aired by guests on Al Jazeera's news programs have often significantly affected the course of events in the region.
 
In Palestine, the station's influence is particularly strong. Recent polling indicates that in the West Bank and Gaza, Al Jazeera is the primary news source for an astounding 53.4 percent of Palestinian viewers. The second and third most watched channels, Palestine TV and Al Arabiya, poll a distant 12.8 percent and 10 percent, respectively. The result of Al Jazeera's market dominance is that it has itself become a mover and shaker in Palestinian politics, helping to craft public perceptions and influence the debate. This has obvious implications for the peace process: how Al Jazeera covers the deliberations and the outcome of any negotiated agreement with Israel will fundamentally shape how it is viewed—and, more importantly, whether it is accepted—by the Palestinian public.
 
Al Jazeera's broad availability in the Arab world "operat[ing] with less constraint than almost any other Arab outlet, and remain[ing] the most popular channel in the region", has been perceived as playing a part in the Arab Spring, including the Tunisian and Egyptian revolutions. The New York Times stated in January 2011: "The protests rocking the Arab world this week have one thread uniting them: Al Jazeera, ... whose aggressive coverage has helped propel insurgent emotions from one capital to the next." The newspaper quoted Marc Lynch, a professor of Middle East Studies at George Washington University: "They did not cause these events, but it's almost impossible to imagine all this happening without Al Jazeera."
 
With Al Jazeera's growing global outreach and influence, some scholars including Adel Iskandar have described the station as a transformation of the very definition of "alternative media." Al Jazeera presents a new direction in the discourse of global news flow and shows voices underrepresented by traditional mainstream media regardless of global imbalances in the flow of information.

Expansion
In 2011, Al Jazeera Media Network launched Al Jazeera Balkans, which is based in Sarajevo and serves the ex-Yugoslavia region in Bosnian, Serbian, and Croatian. The look and feel of the network is similar to Al Jazeera English.
 
Al Jazeera launched a Turkish-language news website in 2014; it was shut down on 3 May 2017.

Al Jazeera English

In March 2003, it launched an English-language website.
 
On 4 July 2005, Al Jazeera officially announced plans to launch a new English-language satellite service to be called Al Jazeera International. The new channel started at 12:00 GMT on 15 November 2006 under the name Al Jazeera English and has broadcast centers in Doha (next to the original Al Jazeera headquarters and broadcast center), London, Kuala Lumpur, and Washington D.C. The channel is a 24-hour, 7-days-a-week news channel, with 12 hours broadcast from Doha, and four hours each from London, Kuala Lumpur, and Washington D.C.
 
Al Jazeera launched an English language channel, originally called Al Jazeera International, in 2006. Among its staff were journalists hired from ABC's Nightline and other top news outfits. Josh Rushing, a former media handler for CENTCOM during the Iraq war, agreed to provide commentary; David Frost was also on board. In an interesting technical feat, the broadcast of the new operation was handed off between bases in Doha, London, Washington, D.C., and Kuala Lumpur on a daily cycle.
 
The new English language venture faced considerable regulatory and commercial hurdles in the North America market for its perceived sympathy with extremist causes. At the same time, others felt Al Jazeera's competitive advantage lay in programming in the Arabic language. There were hundreds of millions of potential viewers among the non-Arabic language speaking Muslims in Europe and Asia, however, and many others who might be interested in seeing news from the Middle East read by local voices. If the venture panned out, it would extend the influence of Al Jazeera, and tiny Qatar, beyond even what had been achieved in the station's first decade. In an interesting twist of fate, the BBC World Service was preparing to launch its own Arabic language station in 2007. Today, evidence of U.S. antipathy at the Arabic network has dissipated significantly, though not entirely, several American analysts said in 2013.

Al Jazeera America

In January 2013, Al Jazeera Media Network purchased Current TV, which was partially owned by former U.S. Vice President Al Gore. Using part of Current TV's infrastructure, Al Jazeera launched an American news channel on 20 August 2013.
 
Though Current TV had large distribution throughout the United States on cable and satellite television, it averaged only 28,000 viewers at any time. The acquisition of Current TV by Al Jazeera allowed Time Warner Cable to drop the network due to its low ratings, but they released a statement saying that they would consider carrying the channel after they evaluated whether it made sense for their customers. Time Warner Cable later began carrying Al Jazeera America in December 2013.
 
In August 2014, Gore and fellow shareholder Joel Hyatt launched a lawsuit against Al Jazeera claiming a residual payment of $65 million of the sale proceeds, due in 2014, remained unpaid. Al Jazeera later announced a countersuit. In 2016, the case was settled outside of court on the basis of a mutual agreement, under which: Gore and Hyatt had their claims waived, Al Jazeera was ordered to pay the $2.35 million in legal fees incurred by the plaintiffs, and the network forfeited its rights to pursue any indemnification claims related to the ordeal.
 
On 13 January 2016, Al Jazeera America CEO Al Anstey announced that the network would cease operations on 12 April 2016, citing the "economic landscape".

Sport channels

beIN SPORTS, formerly Al Jazeera Sport channels, was legally separated from Al Jazeera Media Network on 1 January 2014 and is now controlled by beIN Media Group.
 
beIN SPORTS currently operates three channels in France – beIN Sport 1, beIN Sport 2 and beIN Sport MAX – and launched two channels in the United States (English and Spanish) in August 2012. The network also has a Canadian Channel and holds Canadian broadcast rights to several sports properties, The network also has an Australian channel.
 
beIN Sport holds the rights to broadcast major football tournaments on French television, including Ligue 1, Bundesliga, the UEFA Champions League and the European Football Championships. In the United States and Canada, beIN Sport holds the rights to broadcast La Liga, Serie A, Ligue 1, Copa del Rey, South American World Cup Qualifier and English Championship matches, in addition to Barca TV.
 
In October 2009, Al Jazeera acquired six sports channels of the ART. On 26 November 2009, Al Jazeera English received approval from the CRTC, which enables Al Jazeera English to broadcast via satellite in Canada.

Availability
The original Al Jazeera channel is available worldwide through various satellite and cable systems. For availability info of the Al Jazeera network's other TV channels, see their respective articles. Segments of Al Jazeera English are uploaded to YouTube or at https://www.aljazeera.com/.
 
Europe, Northern Africa and the Middle East. Al Jazeera can be freely viewed with a DVB-S receiver in Europe, Northern Africa and the Middle East as it is broadcast on the Astra 1M, Eutelsat Hot Bird 13A, Eutelsat 10A, Badr 4, Turksat 2A, Thor 6, Nilesat 102, Hispasat 1C and Eutelsat 28A satellites. The Optus C1 satellite in Australia carries the channel for free and from July 2012 is available at no extra charge to all subscribers to Australia's Foxtel pay-TV service.
 
Canada. Al Jazeera is available in Canada on Bell Channel 516, as part of the package "International News I." Al Jazeera is available on Rogers Cable individually. Al Jazeera is also available on Shaw Cable TV Channel 513, as part of the package "Multicultural"
 
India. On 7 December 2010, Al Jazeera said its English language service has got a downlink license to broadcast in India. Satellite and cable companies would therefore be allowed to broadcast Al Jazeera in the country. The broadcaster will be launched soon on Dish TV, and is considering a Hindi-language channel.
 
United Kingdom. Al Jazeera English is available on the Sky and Freesat satellite platforms, as well as the standard terrestrial service (branded Freeview), thus making it available to the vast majority of UK households. On 26 November 2013, it launched a HD simulcast on certain terrestrial transmitters.
 
United States. Al Jazeera English is not widely available, as it is not carried by Xfinity or the other major cable television systems which package and market most commercial television in the United States. It can be viewed online via its live stream on its website, DVB-S, Galaxy 19, and Galaxy 23 C-band satellites.

Following the launch of Al Jazeera America in 2013 until 2016 when the channel folded, Al Jazeera English was not available in the United States. It had been available through live streaming over the Al Jazeera website, DVB-S, Galaxy 19, free to air and Galaxy 23 satellites, and it had been broadcast over the air in the Washington, DC DMA by WNVC on digital channel 30–5, and on digital channel 48.2 in the New York metro area, but those broadcasts were discontinued on 20 August 2013. Al Jazeera English had also been available to cable TV viewers in Toledo, Ohio, Burlington, Vermont, New York City (WRNN rebroadcast), Washington State, and Washington, D.C (a rebroadcast of WNVC's feed), but those sources were switched to Al Jazeera America on 20 August 2013. Many analysts had considered the limited availability of Al Jazeera English in the United States to be effectively a "blackout". The live stream and programming over the internet that had been geoblocked was made available to viewers in the United States again in September 2016.
 
Online. Al Jazeera English can be viewed over the Internet from their official website. The low-resolution version is available free of charge to users of computers and video streaming boxes, and the high-resolution version is available under subscription fees through partner sites. Al Jazeera's English division has also partnered with Livestation for Internet-based broadcasting. This enables Al Jazeera English and Al Jazeera live to be watched worldwide.

On the web
Al Jazeera Media Network's web-based service is accessible subscription-free throughout the world, at a variety of websites. The station launched an English-language edition of its online content in March 2003. This English language website was relaunched on 15 November 2006, along with the launch of Al Jazeera English. The English and Arabic sections are editorially distinct, with their own selection of news and comment. Al Jazeera and Al Jazeera English are streamed live on the official site, as well as on YouTube. On 13 April 2009 Al Jazeera launched versions of its English and Arabic sites suitable for mobile devices.
 
The Arabic version of the site was brought offline for about 10 hours by an FBI raid on its ISP, InfoCom Corporation, on 5 September 2001. InfoCom was later convicted of exporting to Syria and Gaddafi-ruled Libya, of knowingly being invested in by a Hamas member (both of which are illegal in the United States), and of underpaying customs duties.
 
In 2014, Al Jazeera Media Network launched an online only channel called AJ+. The channel is based out of the former Current TV studios in San Francisco and has outposts in Doha, Kuala Lumpur and other locations. It is independent of all of Al Jazeera's other channels and is mostly in an on demand format. The channel launched on 13 June 2014 on with a preview on YouTube. This was followed in 2017 by the launch of Jetty, a podcast network which is also based out of the former Current TV studios in San Francisco.
 
In 2018, Al Jazeera launched a Mandarin-language news website. It is the first Arabic news provider to target the Chinese audience. The staff of the project will be in contact with their audience via Chinese social media like Weibo, Meipai and WeChat.

In 2021, Al Jazeera launched a new online platform called "Rightly" aimed at a conservative US audience. "Right Now with Stephen Kent" is Rightly's first show and is an opinion-led, in-studio interview program hosted by Stephen Kent. Right Now is available on YouTube and as a podcast. It was reported that over 100 staff at Al Jazeera signed an open letter to management objecting to the launch, with some of them voicing their unhappiness with Rightly on Twitter. In 2022, Al Jazeera reportedly stopped creating content for the program.

Creative Commons
On 13 January 2009 Al Jazeera Media Network released some of its broadcast quality footage from Gaza under a Creative Commons license. Contrary to business "All Rights Reserved" standards, the license invites third parties, including rival broadcasters, to reuse and remix the footage, so long as Al Jazeera is credited. The videos are hosted on blip.tv, which allows easy downloading and integration with Miro.
 
Al Jazeera Media Network also offers over 2,000 Creative Commons-licensed still photos at their Flickr account.

Citizen journalism
Al Jazeera Media Network accepts user-submitted photos and videos about news events through a Your Media page, and this content may be featured on the website or in broadcasts.
 
The channel used the Ushahidi platform to collect information and reports about the Gaza War, through Twitter, SMS and the website.

Plans
Future projects in other languages include Al Jazeera Urdu, an Urdu language channel to cater mainly to Pakistanis. A Kiswahili service called Al Jazeera Kiswahili was to be based in Nairobi and broadcast in Kenya, Tanzania, Uganda, Rwanda and Burundi. However, those plans were cancelled due to budget constraints.
 
The channel also has plans to launch a Spanish-language news network to cater mainly to Spain and Hispanic America, like the Iranian cable TV network HispanTV. Al Jazeera has also been reported to be planning to launch an international newspaper. Al Jazeera Arabic began using a chroma key studio on 13 September 2009. Similar to Sky News, Al Jazeera broadcast from that studio while the channel's main newsroom was given a new look. The channel relaunched, with new graphics and music along with a new studio, on 1 November 2009, the 13th birthday of the channel.

Controversies 

While Al Jazeera has a large audience in the Middle East, the organization and the original Arabic channel in particular have been criticised and involved in a number of controversies.

Bullying and harassment

In 2022, many staff alleged that there was bullying and harassment at Al Jazeera.

The allegations emerged after veteran broadcaster Kamahl Santamaria abruptly quit his job at New Zealand state broadcaster TVNZ amid harassment complaints, shortly after he moved there from Al Jazeera.

Investigations found he had been the subject of multiple complaints at Al Jazeera before moving to New Zealand, and that Al Jazeera staff had also accused other senior employees of harassment or bullying. It was claimed that this behaviour was tolerated at Al Jazeera.

Bahrain
In May 2000, Bahrain banned Al Jazeera's broadcasts due to the channel's comments about Bahrain's municipal elections, labelling it as "serving Zionism".

United States
Several Al Jazeera staff were killed by U.S. military friendly-fire incidents.
The United-States-controlled Iraqi interim government closed the offices of Al Jazeera in Baghdad in August 2004 during the United States occupation of Iraq. The interim Iraqi prime minister Iyad Allawi then accused the channel of inciting hatred in the country. At the end of April 2013, the Iraqi government led by Nouri Al Maliki once again ordered Al Jazeera to stop broadcasting due to the alleged role of the channel in encouraging the sectarian unrest. In response to the restrictions imposed by Al Maliki, Al Jazeera issued a statement in which the organization expressed its astonishment at the development, and reiterated their assertion, "We cover all sides of the stories in Iraq, and have done for many years." The network further objected to the ban, saying, "The fact that so many channels have been hit all at once though suggests this is an indiscriminate decision. We urge the authorities to uphold freedom for the media to report the important stories taking place in Iraq."
 
In 2019, congressman Jack Bergman wrote in the Washington Examiner that "Al Jazeera's record of radical anti-American, anti-Semitic, and anti-Israel broadcasts warrants scrutiny from regulators to determine whether this network is in violation of US law".

Egypt's Tahrir Square
During the 2011 Egyptian protests, on 30 January the Egyptian government ordered the TV channel to close its offices. The next day Egyptian security forces arrested six Al Jazeera journalists for several hours and seized their camera equipment. There were also reports of disruption in Al Jazeera Mubasher's Broadcast to Egypt. The channel was also criticized for being sympathetic to Mohamed Morsi and the Muslim Brotherhood and former IAEA director Mohammed ElBaradei. It was closed for the same reasons in September 2013.
Twenty-two members of staff of Al Jazeera's Egyptian bureau announced their resignation on 8 July 2013, citing biased coverage of the ongoing Egyptian power redistribution in favour of the Muslim Brotherhood. Al Jazeera says that the resignations were due to pressure from the Egyptian military.

Syria
Al Jazeera has been criticized over unfair coverage of the Syrian Civil War. The channel's reporting has been described as largely supportive of the rebels, while demonizing the Syrian government. The Lebanese newspaper As-Safir cited outtakes of interviews showing that the channel's staff coached Syrian eyewitnesses and fabricated reports of oppression by Syria's government. In January 2013, a former Al Jazeera employee from Syria stated their belief that there was ongoing strong pressure to conform to biased coverage of the Syrian Civil War. However, according to Pew Research Center study, in its coverage of the Syrian crisis, Al Jazeera America cable news channel provided viewers with content that often resembles what Americans saw on other U.S. cable news outlets.

India five-day ban
The Indian government banned the Al Jazeera TV channel in April 2015 for five telecast days as it repeatedly displayed disputed maps of India. The suspension concerns maps of Pakistan used in 2013 and 2014 that did not demarcate the part of Kashmir under Pakistani control (Pakistan-administered Kashmir) as a separate territory. Once notified by Indian authorities, the channel said it ensured all maps from 22 September 2014, onward used dotted lines and unique shading for the disputed portions.

Israel
On 19 July 2008, Al Jazeera TV broadcast a program from Lebanon which covered the "welcome-home" festivities for Samir Kuntar, a Lebanese citizen who had been imprisoned in Israel for killing four people in a Palestine Liberation Front raid from Lebanon into Israel. In the program, the head of Al Jazeera's Beirut office, Ghassan bin Jiddo, praised Kuntar as a "pan-Arab hero" and organized a birthday party for him. In response, Israel's Government Press Office (GPO) announced a boycott of the channel, which was to include a general refusal by Israeli officials to be interviewed by the station, and a ban on its correspondents from entering government offices in Jerusalem. A few days later an official letter was issued by Al Jazeera's director general, Wadah Khanfar, in which he admitted that the program violated the station's Code of Ethics and that he had ordered the channel's programming director to take steps to ensure that such an incident does not recur.
 
On 15 March 2010, Channel Ten (Israel) broadcast a video story about the Coastal Road massacre on 11 March 1978, with two photographs of a victim and an attacker, both women, with Al Jazeera's logo. Photographer Shmuel Rahmani, who took these photos, sued Al Jazeera in the Jerusalem District Court, for copyright infringement of the two photographs. On 19 February 2014, the court ruled that Al Jazeera would pay 73,500 ILS to Rahmani. On 23 November 2017, a second verdict of 30,000 ILS against Al Jazeera was made in the Nazareth District Court. At the end of 2017, a third lawsuit was brought by Michael Ganoe, an American Evangelical Christian activist who has lived in Israel, in the Tel Aviv District Court, after infringing copyrights of his private videos of volunteering for the Israel Defense Forces, in which he was also compared by an independently produced documentary for Al Jazeera network to volunteering for the Islamic State of Iraq and the Levant. On 15 November 2018, Ganoe won in a settlement deal  from Al Jazeera.

Website attacks
Immediately after its launch in 2003, the English site was attacked by one or several hackers, who launched denial-of-service attacks, and another hacker who redirected visitors to a site featuring a Flag of the United States. Both events were widely reported as Al Jazeera's website having been attacked by "hackers". In November 2003, John William Racine II, also known as 'John Buffo', was sentenced to 1,000 hours of community service and a $1,500 U.S. fine for the online disruption. Racine posed as an Al Jazeera employee to get a password to the network's site, then redirected visitors to a page he created that showed an American flag shaped like a U.S. map and a patriotic motto, court documents said. In June 2003, Racine pleaded guilty to wire fraud and unlawful interception of an electronic communication. As of 2012, the perpetrators of the denial-of-service attacks remain unknown.

Shariah and Life
Shariah and Life (al-Sharīʿa wa al-Ḥayāh) is an Al Jazeera Arabic show with an estimated audience of 60 million worldwide and stars Muslim preacher Yusuf al-Qaradawi, who is described as "Islam's Spiritual 'Dear Abby'". The format of Sharia and Life is similar to that of al-Qaradawi's earlier programing on Qatar TV as well as Egyptian television shows going as far back as the 1960s. Programs interpreting the Quran or dealing with religious issues were popular from Morocco to Saudi Arabia. The now defunct show has been the repeated subject of controversy. In January 2009, Qaradawi stated: "Throughout history, Allah has imposed upon the [Jews] people who would punish them for their corruption. The last punishment was carried out by [Adolf] Hitler." In October 2010, Qaradawi was asked if Muslims should acquire nuclear weapons "to terrorize their enemies." Qaradawi said he was pleased Pakistan had such a weapon, that the goal of nuclear weapons would be permissible, and provided religious justification quoting Qur'anic verses urging Muslims "to terrorize thereby the enemy of God and your enemy."

Censorship in a documentary about slavery 
In August 2018, it was reported that Al Jazeera had censored the documentary series  Rotas da Escravatura , a joint European series by French channel Arte, Portuguese RTP and LX Filmes.   The entire first episode, which dealt with  "the process that led the Muslim Empire to enduringly weave an immense network of slave trade across Africa, the Middle East and Asia"  was deleted. In return, the television network claimed that slavery in Africa was a practice founded by the Portuguese.

Widespread Muslim involvement in the slave trade is a fact historically established by historians;   among others, Bernard Lewis addressed this theme in his book  Race and Slavery in the Middle Eastː an Historical Inquiry.

Editorial independence
Al Jazeera Media Network is a "Private Foundation of Public Benefit" under Qatari law. Under this structure, Al Jazeera Media Network receives funding from the government of Qatar, but maintains its editorial independence. Critics have accused Al Jazeera of supporting the positions of the Qatari government though Al Jazeera platforms and channels have published content that has been critical of Qatar or has run counter to Qatari laws and norms. Al Jazeera's editorial independence has been affirmed by journalism associations and organizations including the National Press Club and Reporters Without Borders.
 
In 2010, United States Department of State internal communications, released by WikiLeaks as part of the 2010 diplomatic cables leak, said that the Qatar government manipulates Al Jazeera coverage to suit political interests.
 
In September 2012, The Guardian reported that Al Jazeera's editorial independence came into question when the channel's director of news, Salah Negm, stepped in at the last minute to order that a two-minute video covering a UN debate over the Syrian civil war include a speech by the leader of Qatar, Hamad bin Khalifa Al Thani. Although the order came from internal editorial staff, staff members protested that the speech was not the most important aspect of the debate, and that it was a repetition of previous calls for Arab intervention.

On 11 January 2015, The Week published a report describing Al Jazeera as a non-biased network.

Awards

 In March 2003, Al Jazeera was awarded by Index on Censorship for its "courage in circumventing censorship and contributing to the free exchange of information in the Arab world."
 In April 2004, the Webby Awards nominated Al Jazeera as one of the five best news Web sites, along with BBC News, National Geographic, RocketNews and The Smoking Gun. According to Tiffany Shlain, the founder of the Webby Awards, this caused a controversy as [other media organisations] "felt it was a risk-taking site".
 In 2004, Al Jazeera was voted by brandchannel.com readers as the fifth most influential global brand behind Apple Computer, Google, IKEA and Starbucks.
 In January 2013, Al Jazeera was nominated for the Responsible Media of the Year award at the British Muslim Awards.
 In 2019 Al Jazeera Investigations Unit won the Walkley Awards for "Scoop of the Year".
 In 2021 Al Jazeera received a journalism award by Hamas as a result of the network's coverage of the latest Gaza conflict.

Selected documentaries 
 Al Jazeera's coverage of the invasion of Iraq was the focus of a documentary film, Control Room (2004) by Egyptian-American director Jehane Noujaim.
 In July 2003, PBS broadcast a documentary called Exclusive to al-Jazeera on its program Wide Angle.
 In 2008, Al Jazeera filmed Egypt: A Nation in Waiting, which documented trends in Egypt's political history and foreshadowed the Egyptian Revolution of 2011.
 Another documentary, Al Jazeera, An Arab Voice for Freedom or Demagoguery? The UNC Tour was filmed two months after 11 September 2001 Terrorist Attack.
 ISIL and the Taliban. Filmed in 2015 by an Arab Al Jazeera reporter named Najibullah Quraishi, it covers Islamic State's presence in Afghanistan and how they groom children for their causes. It is about Taliban commanders angry about Islamic State's presence, Afghan National Army starting offensives in Achin and 2 suicide bombers targeting Jandal, a former warlord.
 Tutu's Children (2017), a documentary about Desmond Tutu's experiment of coaching young professionals to be African leaders.
 The Lobby TV series, is about an undercover Al Jazeera reporter who infiltrates several pro-Israel advocacy organizations in Washington, D.C. including Stand With Us, The Israel Project, the Foundation for Defense of Democracies, the Israel on Campus Coalition, and the Zionist Organization of America's (ZOA) Fuel For Truth.
 Four Dead in Ohio (2010), a documentary about the 1970 Kent State shootings at Kent State University. Also known as the 4 May Massacre or the Kent State Massacre, the incident involved unarmed college students shot by Ohio National Guard members on campus during a mass protest against bombing of Cambodia by U.S. military forces.

Competitors
 Al Mayadeen is a pan-Arabist satellite television channel supported by the Islamic Republic of Iran. It was launched on 11 June 2012 in Lebanon. The channel, claims Gulf-supported media, aims at reducing the influence of the Al Jazeera and Al Arabiya networks, both funded by oil-rich Sunni Arab countries in the Persian Gulf. However, it is said to plan to present an alternative to mainstream Arab satellite media, largely dominated by these two channels.
 In response to Al Jazeera, a group of Saudi investors created Al Arabiya in the first quarter of 2003. Despite (especially initial) skepticism over the station's Saudi funding (cf. History) and a perception of censorship of anti-Saudi content, Al Arabiya has successfully emulated Al Jazeera, garnered a significant audience share, and has also become involved in controversy – Al Arabiya has been severely criticised by the Iraqi and US authorities and once had journalists killed on the job.
 In order to counter a perceived bias of Al Jazeera, the U.S. government in 2004 founded Al Hurra ("the free one"). Al Hurra is forbidden to broadcast to the US under the provisions of the Smith–Mundt Act. A Zogby poll found that 1% of Arab viewers watch Al Hurra as their first choice. while an Ipsos-MENA poll from March–May 2008 showed that Al Hurra was drawing more viewers in Iraq than Al Jazeera. Citing these figures, Alvin Snyder, author and former USIA executive, referred to Al Hurra as a "go to" network in Iraq.
 Another competitor is Al Alam, established in 2003 by Islamic Republic of Iran Broadcasting, which broadcasts continuously. It seeks to address the most challenging issues of the Shia Muslim and Arab world and the Middle East.
 A further competitor is the Rusiya Al-Yaum channel – the first Russian TV news channel broadcasting in Arabic and headquartered in Moscow, Russia. Rusiya Al-Yaum started broadcasting on 4 May 2007. The Channel is established and operated by RIA Novosti, the same news agency that launched Russia Today TV in December 2005 to deliver a Russian perspective on news to English-speaking audiences, and "Rusiya Al-Yaum" is indeed a translation of "Russia Today" into Arabic.
 The BBC launched BBC Arabic Television on 11 March 2008, an Arabic-language news channel in North Africa and the Middle East. This is the second time that the BBC has launched an Arabic language TV channel; as mentioned above, the demise of the original BBC World Service Arabic TV channel had at least contributed to the founding of the original Al Jazeera Arabic TV channel.
 Deutsche Welle began broadcasting in Arabic in 2002. On 12 September 2011, the German international broadcaster launched DW (Arabia), its Arabic language television channel for North Africa and the Middle East. The network has expanded from an initial two-hour block to 16 hours of daily programming in Arabic starting March 2014. The schedule is completed with 8 hours of English language programming. In February 2014, DW (Arabia) announced the acquisition of reprise transmission rights of Egyptian satirist Bassem Youssef's popular show AlBernameg.
 On 4 April 2010. TRT Arabi, the Arabic speaking channel of the Turkish national public broadcaster, was launched leading to a more consolidated role of Turkey in the Arab world.
 When Euronews started broadcasting its programs in Arabic on 12 July 2008, it entered into competition with Al Jazeera. Arabic is the eighth language in which Euronews is broadcast, after English, French, German, Russian, Spanish, Italian, and Portuguese.
 Since the launch of Al Jazeera English, Al Jazeera directly competes with BBC World News and CNN International, as do a growing number of other international broadcasters such as Deutsche Welle, France 24, NHK World, RT, Press TV, CGTN, TRT World and WION.

See also

 Al Jazeera effect
 International news channels
 List of Arabic-language television channels
 Media of Qatar
 State media

Notes

References

Further reading
 
 Abdul-Mageed, M. M., and Herring, S. C. (2008). Arabic and English news coverage on aljazeera.net. In: F. Sudweeks, H. Hrachovec, and C. Ess (Eds.), Proceedings of Cultural Attitudes Towards Technology and Communication 2008 (CATaC'08), Nîmes, France, 24 June-27. Abstract and full article: Arabic and English News Coverage on aljazeera.net
 M. Arafa, P.J. Auter, & K. Al-Jaber (2005), Hungry for news and information: Instrumental use of Al-Jazeera TV among viewers in the Arab World and Arab diaspora, Journal of Middle East Media, 1(1), 21–50
 Marc Lynch (2005), Voices of the New Arab Public: Iraq, al-Jazeera, and Middle East Politics Today, Columbia University Press
 N. Miladi (2004), Al-Jazeera, 
 Hugh Miles (2004), Al Jazeera: How Arab TV news challenged the world, Abacus,
 a.k.a. Al Jazeera: How Arab TV News challenges America, Grove Press,  (2005 reprint),
 a.k.a. Al Jazeera: The inside story of the Arab news channel that is challenging the West, Grove Press,  (2006 reprint)
 Mohammed el-Nawawy and Adel Iskandar (2002), Al-Jazeera: How the Free Arab News Network Scooped the World and Changed the Middle East, Westview Press,
 a.k.a. Al-Jazeera: The story of the network that is rattling governments and redefining modern journalism, a.k.a. Al-Jazeera: Ambassador of the Arab World, Westview Press/Basic Books/Perseus Books,  (2003 reprint)
 Erik C. Nisbet, Matthew C. Nisbet, Dietram Scheufele, and James Shanahan (2004),  (187 KiB), Harvard International Journal of Press/Politics 9 (2), 11–37
 Donatella Della Ratta (2005), Al Jazeera. Media e società arabe nel nuovo millennio , Bruno Mondadori, 
 Naomi Sakr (2002), Satellite Realms: Transnational Television, Globalization and the Middle East, I.B. Tauris, 
 Tatham, Steve (2006), Losing Arab Hearts & Minds: The Coalition, Al-Jazeera & Muslim Public Opinion, C. Hurst & Co. (London), Published 1 January 2006, 
 Mohamed Zayani (2005), The Al Jazeera Phenomenon: Critical Perspectives on New Arab Media, Paradigm Publishers, 
 Augusto Valeriani (2005), Il giornalismo arabo, (Italian) Roma, Carocci

External links

 

  Al Jazeera's official story
 

 
1996 establishments in Qatar
Arab mass media
Arab Spring and the media
Arabic-language television stations
International broadcasters
Journalism articles needing attention
Mass media in Doha
Multilingual news services
Qatari brands
Recipients of the Four Freedoms Award
Television channels and stations established in 1996
Television networks in Qatar
Qatari companies established in 1997
Mass media companies established in 1997
Publicly funded broadcasters
Qatari news websites